
Gmina Zagrodno is a rural gmina (administrative district) in Złotoryja County, Lower Silesian Voivodeship, in south-western Poland.

Neighbouring gminas
Gmina Zagrodno is bordered by the gminas of Chojnów, Pielgrzymka, Warta Bolesławiecka and Złotoryja.

Villages
The gmina contains the villages of Brochocin, Grodziec, Jadwisin, Łukaszów, Modlikowice, Olszanica, Radziechów, Uniejowice, Wojciechów and Zagrodno.

References

Zagrodno
Złotoryja County